The Main Street Historic District in Cromwell, Connecticut is roughly bounded by Nooks Hill Rd., Prospect Hill Rd., Wall and West Sts. and New Ln., and Stevens Ln. and Main St.

It includes two town greens (Valour Green and Memorial Green), historic homes and the Cromwell Historical Society. The historic district is primarily linear and starts from "Patriots Corner" (a grassy area at the corner of Main and Wall Streets with several memorials) and runs north along Main Street (Route 99) past the Memorial Green at Wall Street. Towards the northern end, the district widens to encompass both Main Street and Prospect Hill Road until about Nooks Hill Road, including the Valour Green. The district is notable in capturing the transformation of a rural 18th-century village center into a 20th-century town, with representative architecture from every major architectural style seen between 1750 and 1935. The district was listed on the National Register of Historic Places in 1985.

Cromwell was settled in the 17th century, and remained predominantly agricultural in character well into the 19th century.  It had a small but locally important port on the Connecticut River, which declined in the 19th century, and Main Street afterward became the principal economic and civic area of the town.  Main Street was part of a major turnpike route, connecting Hartford and Old Saybrook, and is where the town's early civic buildings were located.

See also
National Register of Historic Places listings in Middlesex County, Connecticut

References

Cromwell, Connecticut
Historic districts in Middlesex County, Connecticut
National Register of Historic Places in Middlesex County, Connecticut
Historic districts on the National Register of Historic Places in Connecticut